The Monocacy Site is an archeological site located along the Potomac River. The site spans several eras ranging from Archaic period to the early Woodland period.  Projectile points, pottery and soapstone vessels have been found here, with pottery dated to c. 1145-865 BC. The site is the deepest known stratified site in Maryland.

References

External links
, including 1970 photo, at Maryland Historical Trust

Archaic period in North America
Archaeological sites in Frederick County, Maryland
Archaeological sites on the National Register of Historic Places in Maryland
Native American history of Maryland
Woodland period
National Register of Historic Places in Frederick County, Maryland